Acaulospora terricola is a species of fungi in the family Acaulosporaceae. It forms arbuscular mycorrhiza and vesicles in roots. It was first identified in India in 2003.

External links
Index Fungorum

References 

Diversisporales

Taxa described in 2003
Fungi of India